Yong'an Town is a rural town in Liuyang City, Hunan Province, People's Republic of China. It is surrounded by Shashi Town to the north, Beisheng Town to the east, Dongyang Town to the southeast, Chunhua Town in Changsha County to the west, and Jiangbei Town of Changsha County to the south.

Administrative division
The town is divided into seven villages and four communities, the following areas: 
 Xinyuan Community
 Yong'an Community
 Yongxin Community
 Fengyu Community
 Ligeng Village
 Shanshui Village
 Lutang Village
 Duzheng Village
 Pingtou Village
 Yonghe Village
 Xihutan Village

Geography
Yong'an Town has three major reservoirs: Fengxing Reservoir, Shinao Reservoir and Guihua Reservoir.

The Laodao River flows through the town.

Economy
The local economy is primarily based upon agriculture and local industry.

Education
 Yong'an Middle School

Transportation

Expressway
The Changsha–Liuyang Expressway, from Changsha, running west to east through the town to Jiangxi.

Provincial Highway
The Provincial Highway S319 runs through the town.

References

Divisions of Liuyang
Liuyang